The Lazarus Heart is an original novel by American writer Poppy Z. Brite, set in the universe of The Crow. It was published in 1998 by Harper Prism.  Like the majority of Brite's fiction, The Lazarus Heart is set in New Orleans.

Wrongly executed for the murder of his gay lover, Jared is resurrected by the crow to get vengeance and bring justice to the real killer.  He is assisted in the mission by his lover's trans woman twin.

The novel's basic plot was the direct inspiration for The Crow: Salvation, the third film in the series.

1999 American novels
1999 fantasy novels
Novels by Poppy Z. Brite
American horror novels
Novels with gay themes
Novels set in New Orleans
LGBT speculative fiction novels
American LGBT novels
Superhero novels
1990s LGBT novels
The Crow
LGBT-related horror literature